Worplesdon Phoenix Football Club is an English football club based in Worplesdon, Surrey. As Guildford & Worplesdon, they featured in the FA Vase during the early 1980s. The club is a FA chartered Standard club affiliated to the Surrey County Football Association. The club plays its home games at the Worplesdon Memorial Ground.

History
Formed in 1919 as Worplesdon F.C., the club was a founder member of the Woking and District League before joining the Surrey Senior League. After a few unsuccessful seasons in the mid-1970s, the club was renamed Guildford & Worplesdon and became founder members of the Combined Counties Football League, then called the Home Counties League. Finishing sixth in the league's inaugural season, Guildford & Worplesdon won the league in 1979–80. They competed at this level until the end of the 1983–84 season, when they dropped out.

During this period, the club also competed in the FA Vase, their best performance being their last appearance in 1983–84, when they beat Horndean 3–0 in the preliminary round before losing 2–1 at home to Dorking in the first round.

Reverting to the name of Worplesdon F.C., the club has played for many years in the Surrey County Intermediate League (Western), and was relegated to Division One in 2005–06. Subsequently, merging with another local club, Woking Phoenix, the club was renamed Worplesdon Phoenix. They were promoted back to the Premier Division in 2007–08, but were relegated again in 2013–14.

Ground

Worplesdon Phoenix play their home games at Worplesdon Memorial Ground, Worplesdon Road, Worplesdon, Surrey GU3 3RF.

The sports pavilion was rebuilt in 2008 and was opened by former Spurs player David Howells.

Honours

League
Combined Counties Football League
Winners (1): 1979–80 (as Guildford & Worplesdon)
Surrey County Intermediate League (Western) Division One 
Winners (1): 2007–08

Guildford & Woking Alliance

Winners Division one 2018 - 2019

Records
FA Vase best performance: First round 1983–84

References

External links

Football clubs in England
Football
Football clubs in Surrey
1919 establishments in England
Association football clubs established in 1919
Surrey Senior League
Combined Counties Football League
Surrey County Intermediate League (Western)